Engly Lie (born 4 August 1919 in Vennesla, died 1 November 2001) was a Norwegian politician for the Labour Party.

He was elected to the Norwegian Parliament from Vest-Agder in 1973, and was re-elected on two occasions. He had previously served as a deputy representative during the term 1965–1969.

On the local level he was a member of Vennesla municipal council from 1955 to 1973, serving as mayor from 1959. From 1959 to 1963 he was also a member of Vest-Agder county council.

Outside politics he worked as a carpenter.

References

1919 births
2001 deaths
Members of the Storting
Mayors of places in Vest-Agder
Labour Party (Norway) politicians
People from Vennesla
20th-century Norwegian politicians